LASOK or Popular Socialist Movement (Laiko sosialistiko kinima) is a center-left political party in the Republic of Cyprus. It participated in the parliamentary elections of 2011, but won no seats. LASOK also participated in the 2013 presidential elections with the party's founder being a candidate.

See also 
2013 Cypriot presidential election

References

Socialist parties in Cyprus